David Dodge may refer to:
 David A. Dodge (born 1943), Canadian economist and Governor of the Bank of Canada from 2001 to 2008
 David Dodge (novelist) (1910–1974), American novelist
 David Low Dodge (1774–1852), American philanthropist, founder of the New York Peace Society
 David S. Dodge (1922–2009), former President of the American University of Beirut
 David Stuart Dodge (1836–1921), professor for English and modern languages